Pennhurst State School and Hospital v. Halderman, 465 U.S. 89 (1984), was a United States Supreme Court decision holding that the Eleventh Amendment prohibits a federal court from ordering state officials to obey state law.

Background

Analysis and significance

References

Bibliography
Court documents

Law journal analyses
 
 
 
 
 
 
 

Journalism
 
 
 

Other sources

External links
 
 Suffer The Little Children, a 1968 exposé on Pennhurst State School by NBC10 reporter Bill Baldini.

United States disability case law
United States Eleventh Amendment case law
United States Supreme Court cases
United States Supreme Court cases of the Burger Court
1981 in United States case law
1984 in United States case law
Mental health law in the United States
Mental health case law
Deinstitutionalization in the United States